The Elk Mountains are a mountain range in Elko County, Nevada, United States. The range is contained within the Jarbidge Ranger District of the Humboldt-Toiyabe National Forest and is considered to be a sub-range of the Jarbidge Mountains. The highest point is Elk Mountain.

References 

Mountain ranges of Nevada
Mountain ranges of Elko County, Nevada